Robert Patrick Masterson (July 23, 1915 – June 29, 1994) was an American football End in the National Football League (NFL).  He played six seasons for the Washington Redskins (1938–1943). He played college football at the University of Miami and was drafted in the sixth round of the 1938 NFL Draft by the Chicago Bears.  Masterson was inducted into the University of Miami Sports Hall of Fame in 1969.

References

1915 births
1994 deaths
American football ends
Brooklyn Tigers players
Boston Yanks players
Miami Hurricanes football players
New York Yankees (AAFC) players
Washington Redskins players
People from Branchburg, New Jersey
People from Roselle, New Jersey
Players of American football from New Jersey